The  1999 Tampa Bay Devil Rays season was their second since the franchise was created. They finished last in the AL East division with a record of 69 wins and 93 losses. Their manager was Larry Rothschild, who entered his second year with the club.

Offseason
November 25, 1998: Dave Silvestri was signed as a free agent with the Tampa Bay Devil Rays.
 December 11, 1998: José Canseco signed as a free agent with the Tampa Bay Devil Rays.
February 3, 1999: Joe Oliver was signed as a free agent with the Tampa Bay Devil Rays.
 February 19, 1999: Julio Franco was signed as a free agent with the Tampa Bay Devil Rays.
March 31, 1999: Mike Kelly was released by the Tampa Bay Devil Rays.

Regular season
 On August 7, 1999, Wade Boggs had the 3,000th hit of his career. The hit was a home run.

Opening Day starters

Season standings

Record vs. opponents

Notable transactions
April 9, 1999: Dave Silvestri was released by the Tampa Bay Devil Rays.
May 27, 1999: Aaron Small was signed as a free agent with the Tampa Bay Devil Rays.
July 23, 1999: Joe Oliver was traded by the Tampa Bay Devil Rays with Humberto Cota to the Pittsburgh Pirates for Jose Guillen and Jeff Sparks.
June 23, 1999: Jim Morris was signed as a free agent with the Tampa Bay Devil Rays.

Draft picks
 June 2, 1999: Josh Hamilton was drafted by the Tampa Bay Devil Rays in the 1st round (1st pick) of the 1999 amateur draft. Player signed June 3, 1999.
 June 2, 1999: Carl Crawford was drafted by the Tampa Bay Devil Rays in the 2nd round of the 1999 amateur draft. Player signed June 14, 1999.
 June 2, 1999: Doug Waechter was drafted by the Tampa Bay Devil Rays in the 3rd round of the 1999 amateur draft. Player signed June 27, 1999.

Citrus Series
The season series each year between the Devil Rays and the Florida Marlins has come to be known as the Citrus Series.  In 1999, the Marlins won the series 5 games to 1.

June 4 - Devil Rays vs Marlins: 0 – 10
June 5 - Devil Rays vs Marlins:  7 – 9
June 6 - Devil Rays vs Marlins: 6 – 11
July 9 - Devil Rays @ Marlins: 4 – 11
July 10 - Devil Rays @ Marlins: 9 – 8
July 11 - Devil Rays @ Marlins: 2 – 3

The Rookie
While coaching baseball for the Reagan County Owls, Jim Morris made a promise to his team that he would try out for Major League Baseball if his team won the District Championship, something the team had never accomplished before. His team won the title, and Morris kept his end of the bargain. At tryouts, the Major League scout for the Tampa Bay Devil Rays initially wasn't interested in Morris. But, the scout agreed to allow him to try out so Morris could keep his promise to his students.  Surprisingly, Morris discovered that in spite of his age, and having several surgeries on his arm, he was able to throw a 98-mph fastball. In fact, he threw 12 consecutive 98-mph fastballs. After much debate with his family, Morris signed a professional contract with the Tampa Bay Devil Rays organization at the age of 35. He started out with the Minor League Class AA Orlando Rays but after a few appearances he moved up to a spot with the AAA Durham Bulls. Thanks to solid performances with Durham, Tampa Bay gave him a chance to pitch with the big club when the rosters expanded, and on September 18, 1999, against Royce Clayton of the Texas Rangers, the 35-year-old Morris made his debut, striking Clayton out on four pitches.  His goal of pitching in the majors was finally realized, and he made four more appearances later that year.

Roster

Player stats

Batting

Starters by position
Note: G = Games played; AB = At bats; H = Hits; Avg. = Batting average; HR = Home runs; RBI = Runs batted in; SB = Stolen bases

Other batters
Note: G = Games played; AB = At bats; H = Hits; Avg. = Batting average; HR = Home runs; RBI = Runs batted in; SB = Stolen bases

Pitching

Starting pitchers 
Note: G = Games pitched; IP = Innings pitched; W = Wins; L = Losses; ERA = Earned run average; SO = Strikeouts

Other pitchers 
Note: G = Games pitched; IP = Innings pitched; W = Wins; L = Losses; ERA = Earned run average; SO = Strikeouts; Sv = Saves

Relief pitchers 
Note: G = Games pitched; IP = Innings pitched; W = Wins; L = Losses; ERA = Earned run average; SO = Strikeouts; Sv = Saves

Game log

|- style="text-align:center; background: #fbb"
|1
|April 5
|@ Orioles
|10 – 7
|Mussina (1–0)
|Alvarez (0–1)
|Timlin (1)
|46,733
|0-1
|- style="text-align:center; background: #bfb"
|2
|April 7
|@ Orioles
|8 – 5
|Saunders (1–0)
|Guzman (0–1)
|Hernandez (1)
|42,284
|1-1
|- style="text-align:center; background: #bfb"
|3
|April 8
|@ Orioles
|6 – 3
|Witt (1–0)
|Erickson (0–1)
|
|39,853
|2-1
|- style="text-align:center; background: #fbb"
|4
|April 9
|Red Sox
|4 – 1
|Portugal (1–0)
|Arrojo (0–1)
|
|40,525
|2-2
|- style="text-align:center; background: #fbb"
|5
|April 10
|Red Sox
|5 – 3
|Martinez (2–0)
|Santana (0–1)
|Gordon (3)
|28,522
|2-3
|- style="text-align:center; background: #bfb"
|6
|April 11
|Red Sox
|5 – 4
|Aldred (1–0)
|Lowe (0–1) 
|Hernandez (2)
|23,404
|3-3
|- style="text-align:center; background: #fbb"
|7
|April 12
|@ Blue Jays
|7 – 1
|Wells (2–0)
|Saunders (1–1)
|
|37,160
|3-4
|- style="text-align:center; background: #bfb"
|8
|April 13
|@ Blue Jays
|8 – 5
|White (1–0)
|Hamilton (0–2)
|Hernandez (3)
|23,710
|4-4
|- style="text-align:center; background: #fbb"
|9
|April 14
|@ Blue Jays
|7 – 6 (11)
|Lloyd (1–0)
|Lopez (0–1)
|
|23,847
|4-5
|- style="text-align:center; background: #fbb"
|10
|April 15
|@ Blue Jays
|11 – 1
|Carpenter (1–1)
|Santana (0–2)
|
|23,765
|4-6
|- style="text-align:center; background: #bfb"
|11
|April 16
|@ Red Sox
|6 – 2
|Rekar (1–0)
|Wakefield (1–1) 
|
|18,809
|5-6
|- style="text-align:center; background: #fbb"
|12
|April 17
|@ Red Sox
|8 – 5
|Portugal (2–0)
|Saunders (1–2)
|
|26,799
|5-7
|- style="text-align:center; background: #bfb"
|13
|April 18
|@ Red Sox
|5 – 1
|Witt (2–0)
|Rapp (0–1)
|
|27,589
|6-7
|- style="text-align:center; background: #bfb"
|14
|April 19
|@ Red Sox
|4 – 1
|Arrojo (1–1)
|Saberhagen (2–1)
|Hernandez (4)
|33,167
|7-7
|- style="text-align:center; background: #bfb"
|15
|April 20
|Orioles
|5 – 3
|Santana (1–2)
|Erickson (0–3)
|Hernandez (5)
|17,660
|8-7
|- style="text-align:center; background: #bfb"
|16
|April 21
|Orioles
|14 – 8
|Rekar (2–0)
|Mussina (2–1)
|
|22,119
|9-7
|- style="text-align:center; background: #bfb"
|17
|April 22
|Orioles
|1 – 0
|Saunders (2–2)
|Ponson (0–2)
|Hernandez (6)
|17,334
|10-7
|- style="text-align:center; background: #bfb"
|18
|April 23
|Mariners
|5 – 4
|White (2–0)
|Halama (0–2)
|Hernandez (7)
|20,322
|11-7
|- style="text-align:center; background: #fbb"
|19
|April 24
|Mariners
|9 – 4
|Henry (2–0)
|Arrojo (1–2)
|
|26,065
|11-8
|- style="text-align:center; background: #fbb"
|20
|April 25
|Mariners
|6 – 4
|Paniagua (2–2)
|Hernandez (0–1)
|Mesa (5)
|27,163
|11-9
|- style="text-align:center; background: #fbb"
|21
|April 28
|@ White Sox
|10 – 7
|Parque (3–1)
|Rekar (2–1)
|Howry (6)
|?
|11-10
|- style="text-align:center; background: #fbb"
|22
|April 28
|@ White Sox
|9 – 1
|Snyder (3–1)
|Saunders (2–3)
|
|10,300
|11-11
|- style="text-align:center; background: #bfb"
|23
|April 29
|@ White Sox
|4 – 1
|Alvarez (1–1)
|Sirotka (1–3
|Hernandez (8)
|10,022
|12-11
|- style="text-align:center; background: #fbb"
|24
|April 30
|Tigers
|7 – 5
|Weaver (3–1)
|Arrojo (1–3)
|Jones (3)
|19,177
|12-12
|-

|- style="text-align:center; background: #bfb"
|25
|May 1
|Tigers
|4 – 3
|Witt (3–0)
|Moehler (3–3)
|Hernandez (9)
|20,040
|13-12
|- style="text-align:center; background: #fbb"
|26
|May 2
|Tigers
|8 – 2
|Thompson (4–2)
|Santana (1–3)
|
|20,644
|13-13
|- style="text-align:center; background: #bfb"
|27
|May 3
|Tigers
|14 – 6
|Yan (1–0)
|Blair (0–4)
|
|15,430
|14-13
|- style="text-align:center; background: #fbb"
|28
|May 4
|@ Royals
|5 – 3
|Mathews (2–0)
|Hernandez (0–2)
|
|15,470
|14-14
|- style="text-align:center; background: #bfb"
|29
|May 5
|@ Royals
|10 – 7
|White (3–0)
|Witasick (0–2)
|Hernandez (10)
|16,111
|15-14
|- style="text-align:center; background: #bfb"
|30
|May 6
|@ Royals
|5 – 4
|Aldred (2–0)
|Morman (1–1)
|Hernandez (11)
|15,321
|16-14
|- style="text-align:center; background: #fbb"
|31
|May 7
|@ Indians
|20 – 11
|Wagner (1–0)
|Mecir (0–1)
|
|40,601
|16-15
|- style="text-align:center; background: #bfb"
|32
|May 8
|@ Indians
|7 – 6
|Rekar (3–1)
|Nagy (3–3)
|Hernandez (12)
|40,590
|17-15
|- style="text-align:center; background: #fbb"
|33
|May 9
|@ Indians
|5 – 4
|Wright (4–0)
|Alvarez (1–2)
|Jackson (8)
|42,835
|17-16
|- style="text-align:center; background: #fbb"
|34
|May 11
|Twins
|2 – 1
|Radke (4–2)
|Rupe (0–1)
|Aguilera (6)
|17,227
|17-17
|- style="text-align:center; background: #fbb"
|35
|May 12
|Twins
|9 – 4
|Milton (1–3)
|Arrojo (1–4)
|Trombley (2)
|18,068
|17-18
|- style="text-align:center; background: #fbb"
|36
|May 14
|@ Angels
|8 – 3
|Belcher (2–3)
|Witt (3–1)
|
|35,515
|17-19
|- style="text-align:center; background: #bfb"
|37
|May 15
|@ Angels
|3 – 1
|Saunders (3–3)
|Hill (1–3)
|Hernandez (13)
|36,939
|18-19
|- style="text-align:center; background: #bfb"
|38
|May 16
|@ Angels
|7 – 4
|Alvarez (2–2)
|Sparks (1–4)
|
|35,064
|19-19
|- style="text-align:center; background: #bfb"
|39
|May 17
|@ Rangers
|13 – 3
|Rupe (1–1)
|Burkett (0–3)
|
|29,946
|20-19
|- style="text-align:center; background: #bfb"
|40
|May 18
|@ Rangers
|5 – 4
|Arrojo (2–4)
|Morgan (6–3)
|Hernandez (14)
|29,706
|21-19
|- style="text-align:center; background: #fbb"
|41
|May 19
|@ Rangers
|7 – 6
|Zimmerman (3–0)
|Aldred (2–1)
|Wetteland (12)
|29,513
|21-20
|- style="text-align:center; background: #bfb"
|42
|May 21
|Angels
|10 – 9
|White (4–0)
|Magnante (1–1)
|Hernandez (15)
|20,687
|22-20
|- style="text-align:center; background: #fbb"
|43
|May 22
|Angels
|8 – 6
|Petkovsek (4–1)
|Newman (0–1)
|Percival (11)
|23,168
|22-21
|- style="text-align:center; background: #fbb"
|44
|May 23
|Angels
|4 – 0 (10)
|Finley (3–4)
|Hernandez (0–3)
|
|22,522
|22-22
|- style="text-align:center; background: #fbb"
|45
|May 24
|Rangers
|12 – 3
|Clark (3–3)
|Arrojo (2–5)
|
|15,820
|22-23
|- style="text-align:center; background: #fbb"
|46
|May 25
|Rangers
|7 – 2
|Venafro (1–0)
|Witt (3–2)
|
|16,058
|22-24
|- style="text-align:center; background: #fbb"
|47
|May 26
|Rangers
|8 – 6
|Helling (5–5)
|Santana (1–4)
|Wetteland (14)
|17,575
|22-25
|- style="text-align:center; background: #fbb"
|48
|May 28
|@ Mariners
|6 – 1
|García (6–1)
|Alvarez (2–3)
|
|25,421
|22-26
|- style="text-align:center; background: #fbb"
|49
|May 29
|@ Mariners
|11 – 5
|Fassero (3–6)
|Rupe (1–2)
|
|38,093
|22-27
|- style="text-align:center; background: #bfb"
|50
|May 30
|@ Mariners
|15 – 7
|Rekar (4–1)
|Cloude (3–2)
|
|29,090
|23-27
|- style="text-align:center; background: #fbb"
|51
|May 31
|@ Athletics
|10 – 7
|Groom (1–0)
|Yan (1–1)
|
|10,444
|23-28
|-

|- style="text-align:center; background: #fbb"
|52
|June 1
|@ Athletics
|5 – 2
|Rogers (3–2)
|Eiland (0–1)
|Taylor (13)
|7,170
|23-29
|- style="text-align:center; background: #bfb"
|53
|June 2
|@ Athletics
|7 – 6
|Yan (2–1)
|Mathews (5–2)
|Hernandez (16)
|17,505
|24-29
|- style="text-align:center; background: #fbb"
|54
|June 4
|Marlins
|10 – 0
|Springer (2–6)
|Rupe (1–3)
|
|20,167
|24-30
|- style="text-align:center; background: #fbb"
|55
|June 5
|Marlins
|9 – 7
|Meadows (5–5)
|Duvall (0–1)
|Mantei (7)
|22,686
|24-31
|- style="text-align:center; background: #fbb"
|56
|June 6
|Marlins
|11 – 6
|Alfonseca (2–4)
|Yan (2–2)
|
|21,321
|24-32
|- style="text-align:center; background: #fbb"
|57
|June 7
|@ Braves
|9 – 5
|Smoltz (7–1)
|Eiland (0–2)
|Rocker (13)
|36,731
|24-33
|- style="text-align:center; background: #fbb"
|58
|June 8
|@ Braves
|11 – 2
|Pérez (4–2)
|Alvarez (2–4)
|
|35,709
|24-34
|- style="text-align:center; background: #fbb"
|59
|June 9
|@ Braves
|4 – 3 (12)
|McGlinchy (3–2)
|White (4–1)
|
|35,160
|24-35
|- style="text-align:center; background: #fbb"
|60
|June 11
|@ Expos
|5 – 4
|Batista (6 – 2)
|Witt (3–3)
|Urbina (13)
|7,067
|24-36
|- style="text-align:center; background: #bfb"
|61
|June 12
|@ Expos
|5 – 3
|Callaway (1–0)
|Hermanson (3–6)
|Hernandez (17)
|9,307
|25-36
|- style="text-align:center; background: #fbb"
|62
|June 13
|@ Expos
|0 – 4
|Pavano (5–5)
|Rekar (4–2)
|
|7,234
|25-37
|- style="text-align:center; background: #fbb"
|63
|June 14
|@ White Sox
|9 – 7
|Snyder (7–5)
|Alvarez (2–5)
|Howry (11)
|15,457
|25-38
|- style="text-align:center; background: #bfb"
|64
|June 15
|@ White Sox
|3 – 2
|Rupe (2–3)
|Baldwin (3–6)
|Hernandez (18)
|11,347
|26-38
|- style="text-align:center; background: #fbb"
|65
|June 16
|@ White Sox
|3 – 2 (11)
|Lowe (3–0)
|Charlton (0–1)
|
|10,903
|26-39
|- style="text-align:center; background: #fbb"
|66
|June 18
|@ Twins
|8 – 5
|Wells (4–1)
|Aldred (2–2)
|Trombley (9)
|24,157
|26-40
|- style="text-align:center; background: #bfb"
|67
|June 19
|@ Twins
|4 – 3
|Rekar (5–2)
|Radke (5–6)
|Hernandez (19)
|16,823
|27-40
|- style="text-align:center; background: #bfb"
|68
|June 20
|@ Twins
|6 – 5 (11)
|Newman (1–1)
|Trombley (1–4)
|
|15,413
|28-40
|- style="text-align:center; background: #bfb"
|69
|June 21
|@ Twins
|3 – 2
|Rupe (3–3)
|Radlosky (0–1)
|Hernandez (20)
|13,878
|29-40
|- style="text-align:center; background: #fbb"
|70
|June 22
|Yankees
|7 – 0
|Hernández (8–6)
|Witt (3–4)
|
|30,290
|29-41
|- style="text-align:center; background: #fbb"
|71
|June 23
|Yankees
|12 – 4
|Clemens (7–2)
|Eiland (0–3)
|
|30,474
|29-42
|- style="text-align:center; background: #fbb"
|72
|June 24
|Yankees
|7 – 3
|Pettitte (5–5)
|Rekar (5–3)
|Mendoza (2)
|30,499
|29-43
|- style="text-align:center; background: #bfb"
|73
|June 25
|Blue Jays
|11 – 4
|Alvarez (3–5)
|Wells (8–6)
|
|18,633
|30-43
|- style="text-align:center; background: #bfb"
|74
|June 26
|Blue Jays
|5 – 2
|Rupe (4–3)
|Hamilton (1–5)
|Hernandez (21)
|22,062
|31-43
|- style="text-align:center; background: #bfb"
|75
|June 27
|Blue Jays
|8 – 0
|Witt (4–4)
|Escobar (7–5)
|
|20,556
|32-43
|- style="text-align:center; background: #fbb"
|76
|June 28
|Blue Jays
|3 – 2
|Carpenter (5–5)
|Eiland (0–4)
|Koch (9)
|17,727
|32-44
|- style="text-align:center; background: #bfb"
|77
|June 30
|@ Red Sox
|11 – 10 (10)
|Hernandez (1–3)
|Wasdin (7–1)
|
|27,961
|33-44
|-

|- style="text-align:center; background: #bfb"
|78
|July 1
|@ Red Sox
|12 – 3
|Alvarez (4–5)
|Cho (2–1)
|
|29,270
|34-44
|- style="text-align:center; background: #bfb"
|79
|July 2
|@ Blue Jays
|8 – 7
|Aldred (3–2)
|Escobar (7–6)
|Hernandez (22)
|23,109
|35-44
|- style="text-align:center; background: #fbb"
|80
|July 3
|@ Blue Jays
|5 – 0
|Carpenter (6–5)
|Witt (4–5)
|
|25,344
|35-45
|- style="text-align:center; background: #fbb"
|81
|July 4
|@ Blue Jays
|6 – 3
|Hentgen (6–6)
|White (4–2)
|Koch (11)
|24,639
|35-46
|- style="text-align:center; background: #fbb"
|82
|July 5
|Red Sox
|4 – 2
|Portugal (5–6)
|Rekar (5–4)
|Wakefield (9)
|21,967
|35-47
|- style="text-align:center; background: #bfb"
|83
|July 6
|Red Sox
|6 – 4
|Lopez (1–1)
|Wasdin (7–2)
|Hernandez (23)
|17,309
|36-47
|- style="text-align:center; background: #bfb"
|84
|July 7
|Red Sox
|3 – 2
|Eiland (1–4)
|Martínez (15–3)
|Hernandez (24)
|20,959
|37-47
|- style="text-align:center; background: #bfb"
|85
|July 8
|Red Sox
|3 – 2
|Witt (5–5)
|Rose (4–2)
|Hernandez (25)
|21,160
|38-47
|- style="text-align:center; background: #fbb"
|86
|July 9
|@ Marlins
|11 – 4
|Hernández (5–8)
|Rupe (4–4)
|
|17,976
|38-48
|- style="text-align:center; background: #bfb"
|87
|July 10
|@ Marlins
|9 – 8
|Rekar (6–4)
|Springer (3–10)
|Hernandez (26)
|26,516
|39-48
|- style="text-align:center; background: #fbb"
|88
|July 11
|@ Marlins
|3 – 2
|Fernandez (4–5)
|Alvarez (4–6)
|Alfonseca (1)
|19,984
|39-49
|- style="text-align:center; background: #fbb"
|89
|July 15
|Mets
|8 – 7 (10)
|Benítez (1–2)
|Charlton (0–2)
|
|20,905
|39-50
|- style="text-align:center; background: #fbb"
|90
|July 16
|Mets
|9 – 7
|Reed (7–3)
|Eiland (1–5)
|Cook (2)
|22,858
|39-51
|- style="text-align:center; background: #bfb"
|91
|July 17
|Mets
|3 – 2
|Alvarez (5–6)
|Hershiser (9–7)
|Hernandez (27)
|40,186
|40-51
|- style="text-align:center; background: #fbb"
|92
|July 18
|Phillies
|3 – 2
|Schilling (14–4)
|Lopez (1–2)
|
|20,075
|40-52
|- style="text-align:center; background: #fbb"
|93
|July 19
|Phillies
|16 – 3
|Ogea (5–9)
|Rekar (6–5)
|
|17,600
|40-53
|- style="text-align:center; background: #bfb"
|94
|July 20
|Phillies
|5 – 4 (13)
|Charlton (1–2)
|Schrenk (0–1)
|
|30,868
|41-53
|- style="text-align:center; background: #fbb"
|95
|July 21
|@ Yankees
|4 – 3
|Hernández (11–6)
|Witt (5–6)
|Rivera (25)
|27,566
|41-54
|- style="text-align:center; background: #fbb"
|96
|July 22
|@ Yankees
|5 – 4
|Pettitte (7–7)
|Rekar (6–6)
|Rivera (26)
|40,557
|41-55
|- style="text-align:center; background: #fbb"
|97
|July 23
|Rangers
|11 – 8
|Kolb (1–0)
|Rupe (4–5)
|
|18,960
|41-56
|- style="text-align:center; background: #fbb"
|98
|July 24
|Rangers
|5 – 3
|Loaiza (2–1)
|Newman (1–2)
|Wetteland (28)
|22,780
|41-57
|- style="text-align:center; background: #fbb"
|99
|July 25
|Rangers
|4 – 3
|Helling (8–7)
|Arrojo (2–6)
|Wetteland (29)
|21,202
|41-58
|- style="text-align:center; background: #bfb"
|100
|July 26
|Angels
|7 – 0
|Witt (6–6)
|Olivares (8–9)
|
|15,596
|42-58
|- style="text-align:center; background: #fbb"
|101
|July 27
|Angels
|10 – 5
|Magnante (3–1)
|Callaway (1–1)
|
|15,702
|42-59
|- style="text-align:center; background: #bfb"
|102
|July 28
|Angels
|4 – 1
|Rupe (5–5)
|McDowell (0–2)
|Hernandez (28)
|18,336
|43-59
|- style="text-align:center; background: #fbb"
|103
|July 30
|@ Athletics
|4 – 1
|Oquist (8–7)
|Eiland (1–6)
|Taylor (26)
|9,269
|43-60
|- style="text-align:center; background: #fbb"
|104
|July 31
|@ Athletics
|5 – 1
|Olivares (9–9)
|Arrojo (2–7)
|Jones (5)
|20,081
|43-61
|-

|- style="text-align:center; background: #fbb"
|105
|August 1
|@ Athletics
|10 – 6
|Heredia (8–5)
|Witt (6–7)
|Mathews (2)
|24,951
|43-62
|- style="text-align:center; background: #fbb"
|106
|August 2
|@ Mariners
|4 – 0
|García (11–6)
|Callaway (1–2)
|Paniagua (2)
|45,118
|43-63
|- style="text-align:center; background: #fbb"
|107
|August 3
|@ Mariners
|5 – 2
|Halama (9–2)
|Rupe (5–6)
|Mesa (23)
|37,180
|43-64
|- style="text-align:center; background: #bfb"
|108
|August 4
|@ Mariners
|7 – 1
|Eiland (2–6)
|Meche (2–2)
|
|42,336
|44-64
|- style="text-align:center; background: #bfb"
|109
|August 6
|Indians
|4 – 2
|Yan (3–2)
|Burba (8–7)
|Hernandez (29)
|34,623
|45-64
|- style="text-align:center; background: #fbb"
|110
|August 7
|Indians
|15 – 10
|Nagy (13–7)
|Witt (6–8)
|
|39,512
|45-65
|- style="text-align:center; background: #bfb"
|111
|August 8
|Indians
|5 – 3
|Alvarez (6–6)
|Wright (7–7)
|Hernandez (30)
|33,052
|46-65
|- style="text-align:center; background: #bfb"
|112
|August 9
|Orioles
|10 – 9
|Rupe (6–6)
|Johnson (3–6)
|Hernandez (31)
|17,796
|47-65
|- style="text-align:center; background: #fbb"
|113
|August 10
|Orioles
|17 – 1
|Ponson (11–7)
|Eiland (2–7)
|
|17,848
|47-66
|- style="text-align:center; background: #fbb"
|114
|August 11
|Orioles
|4 – 2
|Mussina (14–7)
|Arrojo (2–8)
|Timlin (15)
|17,824
|47-67
|- style="text-align:center; background: #bfb"
|115
|August 12
|@ Royals
|7 – 6
|Witt (7–8)
|Reichert (1–1)
|Hernandez (32)
|16,201
|48-67
|- style="text-align:center; background: #fbb"
|116
|August 13
|@ Royals
|2 – 1
|Service (5–4)
|Yan (3–3)
|
|23,835
|48-68
|- style="text-align:center; background: #bfb"
|117
|August 14
|@ Royals
|11 – 4
|Rupe (7–6)
|Suppan (7–7)
|
|20,684
|49-68
|- style="text-align:center; background: #bfb"
|118
|August 15
|@ Royals
|5 – 3
|Eiland (3–7)
|Suzuki (0–4)
|Hernandez (33)
|19,162
|50-68
|- style="text-align:center; background: #bfb"
|119
|August 16
|@ Tigers
|9 – 1
|Arrojo (3–8)
|Weaver (6–9)
|
|21,102
|51-68
|- style="text-align:center; background: #fbb"
|120
|August 17
|@ Tigers
|3 – 1
|Mlicki (8–11)
|Witt (7–9)
|Jones (19)
|19,418
|51-69
|- style="text-align:center; background: #bfb"
|121
|August 18
|@ Tigers
|4 – 0
|Alvarez (7–6)
|Borkowski (0–4)
|Lopez (1)
|21,311
|52-69
|- style="text-align:center; background: #bfb"
|122
|August 20
|Royals
|5 – 4
|Hernandez (2–3)
|Service (5–5)
|
|18,396
|53-69
|- style="text-align:center; background: #bfb"
|123
|August 21
|Royals
|8 – 2
|Eiland (4–7)
|Witasick (4–10)
|
|35,769
|54-69
|- style="text-align:center; background: #bfb"
|124
|August 22
|Royals
|2 – 1
|Arrojo (4–8)
|Rosado (7–11)
|
|27,864
|55-69
|- style="text-align:center; background: #fbb"
|125
|August 23
|White Sox
|10 – 2
|Baldwin (8–11)
|Witt (7–10)
|
|15,386
|55-70
|- style="text-align:center; background: #bfb"
|126
|August 24
|White Sox
|6 – 5
|Alvarez (8–6)
|Parque (9–10)
|Hernandez (34)
|15,425
|56-70
|- style="text-align:center; background: #fbb"
|127
|August 25
|White Sox
|6 – 1
|Foulke (2–3)
|Rupe (7–7)
|
|15,468
|56-71
|- style="text-align:center; background: #bfb"
|128
|August 26
|White Sox
|9 – 7
|White (5–2)
|Snyder (9–9)
|Hernandez (35)
|16,475
|57-71
|- style="text-align:center; background: #fbb"
|129
|August 27
|@ Indians
|2 – 1
|Burba (11–7)
|Arrojo (4–9)
|Jackson (30)
|43,303
|57-72
|- style="text-align:center; background: #fbb"
|130
|August 28
|@ Indians
|3 – 0
|Nagy (14–9)
|Witt (7–11)
|Jackson (31)
|43,190
|57-73
|- style="text-align:center; background: #bfb"
|131
|August 29
|@ Indians
|6 – 4
|Alvarez (9–6)
|Haney (0–1)
|Hernandez (36)
|43,151
|58-73
|- style="text-align:center; background: #bfb"
|132
|August 31
|@ Orioles
|3 – 0
|Rupe (8–7)
|Ponson (11–10)
|Hernandez (37)
|36,223
|59-73
|-

|- style="text-align:center; background: #fbb"
|133
|September 1
|@ Orioles
|3 – 1
|Johns (4–2)
|Wheeler (0–1)
|Timlin (18)
|37,009
|59-74
|- style="text-align:center; background: #fbb"
|134
|September 2
|@ Orioles
|11 – 6
|Erickson (11–11)
|Arrojo (4–10)
|
|39,172
|59-75
|- style="text-align:center; background: #bfb"
|135
|September 3
|Twins
|4 – 2
|Charlton (2–2)
|Guardado (2–4)
|Hernandez (38)
|15,355
|60-75
|- style="text-align:center; background: #bfb"
|136
|September 4
|Twins
|11 – 3
|Lopez (2–2)
|Miller (2–1)
|
|17,805
|61-75
|- style="text-align:center; background: #fbb"
|137
|September 5
|Twins
|4 – 1
|Radke (12–12)
|Rupe (8–8)
|
|17,480
|61-76
|- style="text-align:center; background: #fbb"
|138
|September 6
|Twins
|13 – 7
|Carrasco (2–2)
|White (5–3)
|
|16,929
|61-77
|- style="text-align:center; background: #fbb"
|139
|September 8
|Tigers
|5 – 1
|Mlicki (12–11)
|Witt (7–12)
|
|14,887
|61-78
|- style="text-align:center; background: #bfb"
|140
|September 9
|Tigers
|5 – 3
|Arrojo (5–10)
|Nitkowski (2–5)
|Hernandez (39)
|15,056
|62-78
|- style="text-align:center; background: #fbb"
|141
|September 10
|Athletics
|7 – 2
|Hudson (10–1)
|Alvarez (9–7)
|
|16,182
|62-79
|- style="text-align:center; background: #fbb"
|142
|September 11
|Athletics
|5 – 4
|Olivares (14–10)
|Rupe (8–9)
|Jones (9)
|25,362
|62-80
|- style="text-align:center; background: #fbb"
|143
|September 12
|Athletics
|4 – 3
|Heredia (12–7)
|Wheeler (0–2)
|Isringhausen (5)
|25,147
|62-81
|- style="text-align:center; background: #fbb"
|144
|September 13
|Athletics
|8 – 3
|Appier (15–12)
|Witt (7–13)
|
|14,936
|62-82
|- style="text-align:center; background: #fbb"
|145
|September 14
|Mariners
|5 – 1
|Moyer (14–6)
|Arrojo (5–11)
|
|15,154
|62-83
|- style="text-align:center; background: #bfb"
|146
|September 15
|Mariners
|8 – 4
|Lopez (3–2)
|Rodriguez (2–4)
|
|15,542
|63-83
|- style="text-align:center; background: #fbb"
|147
|September 16
|Mariners
|5 – 3
|García (15–8)
|Yan (3–4)
|Mesa (33)
|15,817
|63-84
|- style="text-align:center; background: #bfb"
|148
|September 17
|@ Rangers
|7 – 5
|Newman (2–2)
|Helling (13–9)
|Hernandez (40)
|33,695
|64-84
|- style="text-align:center; background: #fbb"
|149
|September 18
|@ Rangers
|6 – 1
|Sele (17–8)
|Witt (7–14)
|
|36,820
|64-85
|- style="text-align:center; background: #bfb"
|150
|September 19
|@ Rangers
|15 – 2
|Arrojo (6–11)
|Burkett (7–8)
|
|24,930
|65-85
|- style="text-align:center; background: #fbb"
|151
|September 20
|@ Angels
|10 – 5
|Finley (11–11)
|Alvarez (9–8)
|
|16,165
|65-86
|- style="text-align:center; background: #fbb"
|152
|September 21
|@ Angels
|7 – 5
|Ortiz (2–3)
|Eiland (4–8)
|Percival (31)
|16,486
|65-87
|- style="text-align:center; background: #fbb"
|153
|September 22
|@ Angels
|8 – 5
|Washburn (3–4)
|Wheeler (0–3)
|
|16,801
|65-88
|- style="text-align:center; background: #fbb"
|154
|September 24
|@ Yankees
|4 – 3 (11)
|Stanton (2–2)
|Charlton (2–3)
|
|44,932
|65-89
|- style="text-align:center; background: #bfb"
|155
|September 25
|@ Yankees
|2 – 1
|Arrojo (7–11)
|Cone (11–9)
|Hernandez (41)
|50,403
|66-89
|- style="text-align:center; background: #bfb"
|156
|September 26
|@ Yankees
|6 – 5
|Lidle (1–0)
|Mendoza (7–9)
|Hernandez (42)
|49,458
|67-89
|- style="text-align:center; background: #bfb"
|157
|September 27
|@ Yankees
|10 – 6
|Duvall (1–1)
|Irabu (11–7)
|Sparks (1)
|41,355
|68-89
|- style="text-align:center; background: #fbb"
|158
|September 28
|Blue Jays
|8 – 2
|Wells (16–10)
|Wheeler (0–4)
|
|19,781
|68-90
|- style="text-align:center; background: #fbb"
|159
|September 29
|Blue Jays
|6 – 2
|Escobar (14–11)
|Witt (7–15)
|
|22,180
|68-91
|-

|- style="text-align:center; background: #fbb"
|160
|October 1
|Yankees
|11 – 7
|Mendoza (9–9)
|Arrojo (7–12)
|Rivera (44)
|27,248
|68-92
|- style="text-align:center; background: #fbb"
|161
|October 2
|Yankees
|3 – 2
|Cone (12–9)
|Álvarez (9–9)
|Rivera (45)
|40,756
|68-93
|- style="text-align:center; background: #bfb"
|162
|October 3
|Yankees
|6 – 2
|Gaillard (1–0)
|Juden (0–1)
|Hernandez (43)
|31,292
|69-93
|-

Farm system

LEAGUE CHAMPIONS: Orlando, Hudson Valley

References

External links 
Tampa Bay Devil Rays at Baseball Reference
1999 Tampa Bay Devil Rays team page at www.baseball-almanac.com

Tampa Bay Devil Rays seasons
Tampa Bay Devil Rays
Tampa Bay Devil Rays